Sam Maxwell (born February 17, 1964) was a weightlifter for the United States.  His coaches were John Thrush and himself.

Weightlifting achievements
Senior World team member (1989)
Junior National Champion (1983 & 1984)
Junior World team member (1983 & 1984)
All-time Junior American record holder in clean and jerk
Official 2000 Olympic Trials Commentator for NBC
2003 World Championships announcer

Note(s) of interest
Competed in hammer throw at University of Washington (189 feet first year)
Snatched 300 lbs. for 17 straight years (1983-1999)
Clean and jerked 400 lbs for 18 straight years (1983-2000)

References

1964 births
Living people
American male weightlifters